Gregory Byrne is an American college athletic director.

Gregory Byrne may also refer to:

Greg Byrne (born 1960), former politician in the province of New Brunswick, Canada
Sir Gregory Byrne, 1st Baronet (died 1712), Irish Jacobite